Class 170 may refer to:

 British Rail Class 170, a diesel multiple-unit train
 FS Class 170, a class of 2-4-0 steam locomotives